Sigrid Müller (born 2 July 1943) is an Austrian former swimmer. She competed in the women's 400 metre freestyle at the 1960 Summer Olympics.

References

External links
 

1943 births
Living people
Olympic swimmers of Austria
Swimmers at the 1960 Summer Olympics
People from Bruck an der Mur
Austrian female freestyle swimmers
Sportspeople from Styria